The following is a list of churches in Dorset, England.

List 

 List of churches in Bournemouth
List of churches in Christchurch
 List of churches in Dorchester
List of churches in East Dorset
List of churches in North Dorset
 List of churches in Poole
List of churches in Purbeck
List of churches in West Dorset
 List of churches in Weymouth and Portland

Dorset

Dorset